Qebleh Bolaghi may refer to:
 Qebleh Bolaghi, Kurdistan
 Qebleh Bolaghi, Zanjan